Why Not! is an album by saxophonist Houston Person that was released by Muse in 1991.

Reception 

In his review on AllMusic, Scott Yanow stated "Houston Person's warm tenor tone, effortless swing, and skill at playing with organists have been taken for granted through the years, since he breaks no new boundaries and is very consistent. On this CD, he forged a new partnership with the young organist Joey DeFrancesco, and they work together perfectly on a set of blues, ballads and standards".

Track listing 
 "Why Not" (Houston Person) – 10:54
 "As Time Goes By" (Herman Hupfeld) – 5:34
 "Namely You" (Gene de Paul, Johnny Mercer) – 6:32
 "Where Is Love?" (Lionel Bart) – 7:02
 "Joey's Blues" (Joey DeFrancesco) – 10:08
 "Blue Gardenia" (Lester Lee, Bob Russell) – 5:13
 "'Deed I Do" (Fred Rose, Walter Hirsch) – 5:13

Personnel 
 Houston Person – tenor saxophone
Joey DeFrancesco – organ   
Philip Harper – trumpet
 Randy Johnston – guitar
Winard Harper – drums
Sammy Figueroa – percussion

References 

Houston Person albums
1991 albums
Muse Records albums
Albums recorded at Van Gelder Studio